Gert Jørgensen (born 16 February 1957) is a Danish former footballer who played as a forward. He made four appearances for the Denmark national team from 1977 to 1978.

References

1957 births
Living people
People from Guldborgsund Municipality
Danish men's footballers
Association football forwards
Denmark international footballers
Austrian Football Bundesliga players
Nykøbing FC players
FC Wacker Innsbruck players
Brøndby IF players
Danish expatriate men's footballers
Danish expatriate sportspeople in Austria
Expatriate footballers in Austria
Sportspeople from Region Zealand